Uncle Tom's Cabin is a 1914 American silent historical drama film directed by William Robert Daly using Vitagraph and starring Sam Lucas, Walter Hitchcock, and Hattie Delaro. It was based upon playwright George L. Aiken's theatrical adaptation of Harriet Beecher Stowe's 1852 novel, Uncle Tom's Cabin. It was produced at Fort Lee, New Jersey by the newly-founded World Film studio.

Its PR proclaimed that (unlike earlier versions) it used "real ice, real bloodhounds, real negroes, real actors, real scenes from real life as it really was in the antebellum days".

In 2012, this film was selected for preservation in the United States National Film Registry by the Library of Congress as being "culturally, historically, or aesthetically significant".

Cast
 Sam Lucas as Uncle Tom 
 Walter Hitchcock as George Shelby 
 Hattie Delaro as Mrs. Shelby 
 Master Abernathy as George Shelby Jr.
 Teresa Michelena as Eliza 
 Irving Cummings as George Harris 
 Paul Scardon as Haley 
 Marie Eline as Little Eva St. Clair 
 Garfield Thompson as St. Clair 
 Roy Applegate as Simon Legree 
 Boots Wall as Topsy

References

Bibliography
 Goble, Alan. The Complete Index to Literary Sources in Film. Walter de Gruyter, 1999.

External links
Uncle Tom’s Cabin essay  by Stephen Railton at National Film Registry

1914 films
1910s English-language films
American silent feature films
American black-and-white films
World Film Company films
Films set in the 19th century
1910s historical drama films
American historical drama films
Films shot in Fort Lee, New Jersey
Uncle Tom's Cabin
United States National Film Registry films
1914 drama films
Silent American drama films
Films directed by William Robert Daly
1910s American films